Aleksandr Nikolayevich Novikov (born 27 February 1958; died 27 June 1991) was a Soviet football player.

Honours
1977 FIFA World Youth Championship winner with the Soviet Union.

Death
On 13 May 1991, the bus with his team FC Iskra Smolensk collided head-on with a truck on a highway on their way back from an away game. Team's head coach Dzhemal Silagadze died instantly, and Novikov died several weeks later in a hospital from head trauma.

References

External links
 

1958 births
1991 deaths
Footballers from Saint Petersburg
Soviet footballers
Road incident deaths in the Soviet Union
FC Iskra Smolensk players
PFC CSKA Moscow players
Association football goalkeepers